The Philippine National Games (PNG) officially known as the POC-PSC Games is a national multi-sport tournament in the Philippines. It was created as a means to determine the possible composition of national pool athletes that will compete in international tournaments such as the Southeast Asian Games, Asian Games and the Olympics.

History
The Philippine National Games (PNG) was created by virtue of Executive Order No. 163 dated March 3, 1994, during the term of former President Fidel V. Ramos.

The first edition was held in Manila in 1994, then the next edition was held two years later in the same venue. Cebu City hosted the third edition in 1997. However, the games were scrapped in 1998 due to lack of funds to organize the event. The holding of games were halted until its revival in 2011. Since then the games were held annually. Starting from the 2011 edition, the Philippine Sports Committee has been co-organizing the games with the Philippine Olympic Committee.

The 2015 edition was divided into three legs which were hosted in Luzon, Visayas and Mindanao with each leg including 10 events each for the same sports doubling as qualifiers for the 2016 edition. Starting the 2016 edition the PNG will be LGU-based. In the previous editions, athletes represented their school, club or a sponsoring group. Athletes will be able to formally represent their municipality, city or province at the games but in the finals athletes will only represent one of the four regions; Luzon, Visayas, Mindanao and National Capital Region.

Editions

Sports
as of May 2014

References

 
Philippines
Recurring sporting events established in 1994
Multi-sport events in the Philippines
1994 establishments in the Philippines
Establishments by Philippine executive order